Tena Canton is a canton of Ecuador, in the Napo Province.  Its capital is the town of Tena.  Its population at the 2001 census was 46,007.

References

Cantons of Napo Province